Norman Edward Row (23 March 1883 – 28 October 1968) was a rugby union player who represented in the Australia national rugby union team. His brother Frank Row was Australia's inaugural rugby Test captain in 1899.

Row, a flanker}, was born in Manly, New South Wales and claimed a total of 6 international rugby caps for Australia.

References

                   

Australian rugby union players
Australia international rugby union players
1883 births
1968 deaths
People from Manly, New South Wales
Rugby union flankers
Rugby union players from Sydney